This Is Tom Jones is an ATV variety series starring Tom Jones. The series was exported to the United States by ITC Entertainment and was networked there by ABC.

The series ran between 1969 and 1971 to total 65 colour episodes. Jones was nominated for a Golden Globe Award for "Best Actor in a Television Series - Musical or Comedy" in 1969.

The show also featured comedy sketches by the Ace Trucking Company improvisational group, featuring Fred Willard and Patti Deutsch, among others.

Guest appearances
The show featured guest appearances by many top actors, comedians and singers of the time, including The Who, Nancy Sinatra, Shirley Bassey, Mary Hopkin, Peter Sellers, Liza Minnelli, Janis Joplin, Cher, Dusty Springfield, Sérgio Mendes, Ella Fitzgerald, Stevie Wonder, The 5th Dimension, Bob Hope, and Herman's Hermits.

Episode guide

1st Season
 #1 - Peter Sellers, Joey Heatherton, Richard Pryor, Mary Hopkin, The Moody Blues - aired: 2/7/1969
 #2 - Nancy Wilson, Mireille Mathieu, Davy Jones, Herman’s Hermits, Rich Little - aired: 2/14/1969
 #3 - Lynn Redgrave, Sergio Mendes and Brasil ’66, Lulu, Tim Conway, The Bee Gees - aired: 2/21/1969
 #4 - Dick Cavett, Terry-Thomas, The 5th Dimension, Sandie Shaw, Julie Driscoll w/Brian Auger and the Trinity - aired: 2/28/1969
 #5 - Shirley Jones, Dick Cavett, Dusty Springfield, Engelbert Humperdinck, The Foundations - aired: 3/7/1969
 #6 - Paul Anka, Mary Hopkin, Georgia Brown, The Crazy World of Arthur Brown, George Carlin - aired: 3/14/1969
 #7 - Cass Elliot, The Dave Clark Five, Massiel, George Carlin - aired: 3/21/1969
 #8 - Chet Atkins, Barbara Eden, Rich Little, Jerry Lee Lewis, Salena Jones - aired: 3/28/1969
 #9 - Judy Carne, Jo Anne Worley, Millicent Martin, Anita Harris - aired: 4/4/1969
 #10 - Donovan, Lainie Kazan, Bobby Goldsboro, Jo Anne Worley, Godfrey Cambridge - aired: 4/11/1969
 #11 - Manitas de Plata, Mireille Mathieu, Pat Paulsen, Fran Jeffries, The Who - aired: 4/18/1969
 #12 - Pat Paulsen, Stevie Wonder, Shani Wallis, The Hollies - aired: 4/25/1969
 #13 - Sonny & Cher, Herman’s Hermits, Esther Ofarim, Cleo Laine, Henry Gibson - aired: 5/2/1969
 #14 - George Burns, John Davidson, Sally Ann Howes - aired: 5/22/1969
 #15 - The 5th Dimension, Dick Cavett, Juliet Prowse, Mireille Mathieu - aired: 5/29/1969

2nd Season
 #16 - Sammy Davis Jr., Jo Anne Worley - aired: 9/25/1969
 #17 - Diahann Carroll, Bobby Darin, Blood, Sweat & Tears, David Steinberg - aired: 10/2/1969
 #18 - Tony Bennett, Vikki Carr, The Ace Trucking Company - aired: 10/9/1969
 #19 - Anthony Newley, Peggy Lipton, Crosby, Stills, Nash and Young, John Byner - aired: 10/16/1969
 #20 - Jose Feliciano, Shelley Berman, Mary Hopkin - aired: 10/23/1969
 #21 - Barbara Eden, Wilson Pickett, Hendra & Ullett - aired: 10/30/1969
 #22 - Connie Stevens, Matt Monro, The Moody Blues, Shecky Greene - aired: 11/6/1969
 #23 - Dick Cavett, Charles Aznavour, Cass Elliot, The Hollies - aired: 11/13/1969
 #24 - Johnny Cash, June Carter, Minnie Pearl, Jeannie C. Riley - aired: 11/20/1969
 #25 - Claudine Longet, Little Richard, The Ace Trucking Company - aired: 11/27/1969
 #26 - Glen Campbell, Janis Joplin, The Committee - aired: 12/4/1969
 #27 - Joel Grey, Sandi Shaw, The Ace Trucking Company - aired: 12/11/1969
 #28 - Liza Minnelli, Frankie Vaughan, Pat Cooper - aired: 12/18/1969
 #29 - Judy Collins, David Frye, Millicent Martin, The Welsh Treorchy Male Choir - aired: 12/25/1969
 #30 - Victor Borge, Harry Secombe, Paula Kelly - aired: 1/1/1970
 #31 - George Gobel, Shani Wallis, Raphael, The Rascals - aired: 1/15/1970
 #32 - Dusty Springfield, Don Ho, Lonnie Donegan, The Ace Trucking Company - aired: 1/22/1970
 #33 - Paul Anka, Joni Mitchell, George Kirby - aired: 1/29/1970
 #34 - Oliver, Nancy Wilson, Phil Harris - aired: 2/5/1970
 #35 - Robert Goulet, Kenny Rogers and the First Edition, Lulu, The Ace Trucking Company - aired: 2/12/1970
 #36 - Leslie Uggams, Joe Cocker & The Grease Band, Guy Marks - aired: 2/19/1970
 #37 - Smokey Robinson & The Miracles, Barbara McNair, Dick Shawn - aired: 2/26/1970
 #38 - Bob Hope, Billy Eckstine, Bobbie Gentry - aired: 3/5/1970
 #39 - Raquel Welch, Lou Rawls, Roy Clark, The Ace Trucking Company - aired: 3/19/1970
 #40 - Ray Charles, Jane Powell, Robert Klein - aired: 3/26/1970
 #41 - Sammy Davis Jr., Band of the Welsh Guards - aired: 4/2/1970

3rd Season
 #42 - Anne Bancroft, Burt Bacharach, The Ace Trucking Company - aired: 9/25/1970
 #43 - Zero Mostel, Diahann Carroll, The Ace Trucking Company - aired: 10/2/1970
 #44 - Bob Hope, Aretha Franklin, The Ace Trucking Company - aired: 10/9/1970
 #45 - Steve Lawrence and Eydie Gorme, José Ferrer, The Ace Trucking Company - aired: 10/16/1970
 #46 - Liza Minnelli, Edward G. Robinson, The Ace Trucking Company - aired: 10/23/1970
 #47 - Glen Campbell, Nancy Sinatra, Jerry Reed, Big Jim Sullivan, The Ace Trucking Company - aired: 10/30/1970
 #48 - Perry Como, Debbie Reynolds, The Unusual We, Patti Deutsch, The Ace Trucking Company - aired: 11/6/1970
 #49 - The Supremes, Scoey Mitchell, Ray Stevens, The Ace Trucking Company - aired: 11/13/1970
 #50 - Jack Jones, Joey Heatherton, Jerry Reed, Big Jim Sullivan - aired: 11/20/1970
 #51 - Florence Henderson, Harry Secombe, The Ace Trucking Company, Big Jim Sullivan - aired: 11/27/1970
 #52 - Nancy Wilson, Buddy Greco, The Ace Trucking Company, Big Jim Sullivan - aired: 12/4/1970
 #53 - George Kirby, Caterina Valente, The Royal Highland Fusiliers, The Ace Trucking Company, Big Jim Sullivan - aired: 12/11/1970
 #54 - Ella Fitzgerald, Rudolf Nureyev, Merle Park, The Welsh Treorchy Male Choir, The Ace Trucking Company, Big Jim Sullivan - aired: 12/25/1970
 #55 - Shirley Bassey, John Denver, The Ace Trucking Company, Big Jim Sullivan - aired: 1/1/1971
 #56 - Phyllis Diller, Lulu, Frankie Vaughan, The Ace Trucking Company, Big Jim Sullivan - aired: 1/8/1971
 #57 - Petula Clark, The Ace Trucking Company, Big Jim Sullivan - aired: 1/15/1971

Rights dispute
In recent years, distribution rights to the show have been the subject of litigation, in relation to the original license holder, C/F International.  For example, as of December, 2004, C/F International was a secured judgement creditor of Classic World Productions and it principal, Darryl Payne, for approximately one million dollars, and was the principal secured creditor at the time of the Chapter 11 bankruptcy filing by the company, six months later.  C/F International's action against Classic World Productions and owner Darryl Payne was based on unpaid royalties in relation to "This Is Tom Jones", and related recordings.  The 1969-1971 "This Is Tom Jones" television shows are currently sold by Time-Life, rather than by Classic World Productions or C/F International.

Home releases
A triple-DVD compilation of performances from the show, subtitled Rock 'n' Roll Legends, was released by Time Life Entertainment (under license from Paul Brownstein Productions) on June 26, 2007, having previously been issued, in various forms, by Classic World Productions. It features performances from Richard Pryor, Mary Hopkin, Peter Sellers, The Who, Burt Bacharach, Anne Bancroft, Glen Campbell, Janis Joplin, Joe Cocker, Big Jim Sullivan, Little Richard, Stevie Wonder, Bob Hope and Aretha Franklin. Crosby, Stills, Nash & Young were featured in early promotional copies, but these were withdrawn when rights issues prevented their performance being released; Little Richard was substituted for the final copies.

Another triple-DVD compilation of performances from the show, subtitled Legendary Performers, was released by Time Life on 12 February 2008. It features performances from Sammy Davis, Jr., Tony Bennett, Bobby Darin, David Steinberg, Liza Minnelli, Rich Little, Jerry Lee Lewis, Chet Atkins, Johnny Cash and June Carter.

References

External links
 
 The Golden Globes

Television series by ITC Entertainment
1960s American variety television series
1970s American variety television series
1960s British television series
1970s British television series
1969 British television series debuts
1971 British television series endings
Television shows shot at ATV Elstree Studios